The Vigilantes Ride is a 1943 American Western film directed by William Berke and written by Ed Earl Repp. The film stars Russell Hayden, Dub Taylor, Bob Wills, Shirley Patterson, Tris Coffin and Jack Rockwell. The film was released on December 23, 1943, by Columbia Pictures.

Plot

Cast          
Russell Hayden as Lucky Saunders 
Dub Taylor as Cannonball Taylor
Bob Wills as Bob Allen
Shirley Patterson as Jane Andrews
Tris Coffin as Anse Rankin
Jack Rockwell as Capt. Randall
Bob Kortman as Drag
Dick Botiller as Rogan
Jack Kirk as Lafe Andrews
Stanley Brown as Rod Saunders

References

External links
 

1943 films
1940s English-language films
American Western (genre) films
1943 Western (genre) films
Columbia Pictures films
Films directed by William A. Berke
American black-and-white films
1940s American films